American Libraries is a digital collection of ebooks and texts at the Internet Archive. This collection contains over 1,900,000 items sponsored by these partners:

 Allen County Public Library
 The Bancroft Library
 Biodiversity Heritage Library
 Boston Library Consortium
 Boston Public Library
 Boston University, Mugar Memorial Library
 Brandeis Universities Libraries
 Brigham Young University
 Brown University Library
 California Academy of Sciences
 Cambridge Public Library
 Church History Library
 Columbia University Libraries
 Consortium of Academic and Research Libraries in Illinois (CARLI)
 Cornell University Library
 Duke University Libraries
 The Federal Library and Information Network (FEDLINK)
 The Field Museum of Natural History Library
 The Getty Research Institute, Research Library
 Indiana University – Purdue University Fort Wayne
 Indiana University Library
 The Johns Hopkins University Sheridan Libraries
 John Carter Brown Library
 Leo Baeck Institute Archives
 Lesley University Library
 Library of Congress
 LYRASIS
 Marine Biological Laboratory and Woods Hole Oceanographic Institution
 Massachusetts Institute of Technology
 Microsoft
 National Agricultural Library (U.S.)
 The National Yiddish Book Center
 New York Public Library
 North Carolina State University Libraries
 Northeastern University Libraries
 Prelinger Library
 Princeton Theological Seminary
 San Francisco Public Library
 The Sloan Foundation
 Smithsonian Institution Libraries
 State Library of Massachusetts
 Sterling and Francine Clark Institute Library
 Trinity College Library
 Tufts University
 United States Copyright Office
 University of California Libraries
 University of Chicago
 University of Idaho
 University of Illinois at Urbana–Champaign
 University of Massachusetts Amherst
 University of Massachusetts Boston
 University of Massachusetts Dartmouth
 University of Massachusetts Lowell
 University of Massachusetts Medical Center
 University of New Hampshire
 University of North Carolina at Chapel Hill
 University of Notre Dame Hesburgh Libraries
 University of Pennsylvania Libraries
 University of Pittsburgh
 US National Library of Medicine
 Wellesley College
 Williams College
 World Health Organization
 Yahoo!

See also
 Canadian Libraries

References

External links
 

Internet Archive collections